Wheless is a surname. Notable people with the surname include:

Hewitt T. Wheless (1913-1986), American military officer
Joseph Wheless (1868-1950), American lawyer
Troy Wheless (born 1980), American basketball player

See also
Thomas and Lois Wheless House, a historic house in North Carolina, U.S.